Radim Raděvič (born 16 December 1966) is a Czech ice hockey player. He competed in the men's tournament at the 1988 Winter Olympics.

Career statistics

Regular season and playoffs

International

References

External links
 

1966 births
Living people
Czech ice hockey forwards
Czechoslovak ice hockey forwards
HK Dukla Trenčín players
TuS Geretsried players
Heilbronner EC players
Ice hockey players at the 1988 Winter Olympics
EHC Klostersee players
HC Kometa Brno players
HC Olomouc players
Olympic ice hockey players of Czechoslovakia
HC Slezan Opava players
HC ZUBR Přerov players
Sportspeople from Opava
VHK Vsetín players
PSG Berani Zlín players
Czechoslovak expatriate sportspeople in Germany
Czechoslovak expatriate ice hockey people
Czech expatriate ice hockey people
Czech expatriate sportspeople in Austria
Expatriate ice hockey players in Austria
Expatriate ice hockey players in Germany